Hammondville is a town in DeKalb County, Alabama, United States. It was incorporated in 1937. As of the 2010 census, the population of the town is 488.

Geography
Hammondville is located at  (34.569414, -85.638305).

Demographics

As of the 2010 census Hammondville had a population of 488.  The racial and ethnic composition of the population was 88.3% non-Hispanic white, 0.8% black or African American, 0.2% Native American, 0.6% Asian, 5.1% from some other race, 3.3% from two or more races and 6.8% Hispanic or Latino or any race.

As of the census of 2000, there were 486 people, 193 households, and 150 families residing in the town. The racial makeup of the town was 95.27% White, 1.65% Black or African American, 0.21% Native American, 0.41% Asian, 0.62% from other races, and 1.85% from two or more races.  2.67% of the population were Hispanic or Latino of any race.

There were 193 households, out of which 34.7% had children under the age of 18 living with them, 62.7% were married couples living together, 10.9% had a female householder with no husband present, and 21.8% were non-families. 18.1% of all households were made up of individuals, and 9.3% had someone living alone who was 65 years of age or older.  The average household size was 2.52 and the average family size was 2.83.

In the town, the population was spread out, with 25.7% under the age of 18, 6.4% from 18 to 24, 28.6% from 25 to 44, 25.5% from 45 to 64, and 13.8% who were 65 years of age or older.  The median age was 39 years. For every 100 females, there were 98.4 males.  For every 100 females age 18 and over, there were 92.0 males.

The median income for a household in the town was $33,056, and the median income for a family was $34,500. Males had a median income of $33,542 versus $17,045 for females. The per capita income for the town was $20,582.  About 8.0% of families and 10.7% of the population were below the poverty line, including 14.2% of those under age 18 and 20.0% of those age 65 or over.

References 

Towns in DeKalb County, Alabama
Towns in Alabama
U.S. Route 11